1,2-Benzoquinone, also called ortho-benzoquinone, is an organic compound with formula . It is one of the two isomers of quinone, the other being 1,4-benzoquinone.  It is a red volatile solid that is soluble in water and ethyl ether.  It is rarely encountered because of its instability, but it is of fundamental interest as the parent compound of many derivatives which are known.

Structure
The molecule has C symmetry. X-ray crystallography shows that the double bonds are localized, with alternatingly long and short C-C distances within the ring.  The C=O distances of 1.21 Å are characteristic of ketones.

Preparation and occurrence
1,2-Benzoquinone is produced on oxidation of catechol exposed to air in aqueous solution or by ortho oxidation of a phenol.

It is a precursor to melanin.

A strain of the bacterium Pseudomonas mendocina metabolises benzoic acid, yielding 1,2-benzoquinone via catechol.

References 

 
Enones

ja:ベンゾキノン#1,2-ベンゾキノン